Karnaa is a 1995 Indian Tamil-language action drama film directed by Selva. The film stars Arjun, Ranjitha and Vineetha. It was released on 14 April 1995, and became a box office success.

Plot 
Vijay is a carefree youth, who is sent by his father ACP Deenadayalan in Ooty to work and become an responsible businessman. He falls in love with the college student Anjali, whose brothers are dangerous criminals and they are against their love from the fact that Vijay's father is a cop. Devaraj is sent to prison in order for his brother to appoint the lawyer Karnaa, who is disabled and Vijay's doppelganger. 

Later, Karnaa falls in love with the school teacher Amudha, after few quarrels among them. One day, Deenadayalan sees Karnaa at the court who is identical to his Vijay. In the past, Deenadayalan had twin boys, but abandoned one of the twin babies because he was disabled. Karnaa is upset when he learns the truth and is now determined to win the case in front of his father. He ultimately wins the case and Devaraj is eventually released. Deenadayalan discloses the truth to his wife Lakshmi, who wants to bring back her son Karnaa at any cost.

Meanwhile, Vijay is arrested by the police because of Devaraj's conspiracy. Karnaa rejects his parents' pleas and finds it outrageous to abandon a baby due to his disability. Karnaa promises to help Vijay, but he advises Vijay to escape from the prison. Devaraj shows his secret illegal business to Karnaa, and Vijay takes some photos of his factory. Afterwards, Devaraj's goons kidnap their parents, Karnaa's adopted mother and Amudha. Vijay and Karnaa finally save them and send Devaraj to prison.

Cast 

Arjun Sarja as Vijay and Karnaa
Ranjitha as Amudha
Vineetha as Anjali
Goundamani as Khalnayak
Senthil as Driver
Ravichandran as ACP Deenadhayalan, Vijay and Karnaa's father
Major Sundararajan as Advocate
Sujatha as Lakshmi, Vijay and Karnaa's mother
Sathyapriya as Karnaa's adopted mother
Mohan Raj as Devaraj
Vimalraj as Devaraj's brother
Kitty as Karnaa's foster father
Chakravarthy
C. R. Saraswathi as Manikkam's wife
Vasuki as Vatsala teacher
Lalitha Kumari as Chellamma
Lakshmipriya
Radhabhai
Kumarimuthu
Kallapart Natarajan
Idichapuli Selvaraj as Chellamma's father
Krishnamoorthy as Manikkam
T. K. S. Natarajan as Pimp
Prasanna Kumar as Advocate
Sakthivel as Henchman
Vijay Ganesh as Henchman
Yuvarani in a special appearance
Rani in a special appearance
Madhusudhan Rao as CBI officer (uncredited)

Production 
While filming the climactic action sequence, stuntman Sahul wanted to try out a bike stunt in a manner inspired by Jackie Chan. Though the producer was hesitant, Arjun was convinced. Sahul managed the sequence in just a single take.

Soundtrack 
The soundtrack was composed by Vidyasagar, with lyrics written by Vairamuthu. The song "Malare Mounama" is set in Darbari Kanada raga. "Aai Shabba" is based on the song "Chebba" by Algerian singer Khaled.

Reception 
K. Vijiyan of New Straits Times wrote, "Karna turns out to be a neat package of sentiment, love, action and songs". R. P. R. of Kalki wrote there are two types of masala: action masala and sentiment masala. R. P. R. wrote that the former makes body painful while the latter makes nose pain. He added that the makers had mixed both and taken it with the goal of entertainment without much wrinkle and spillage.

References

External links 

1990s masala films
1990s Tamil-language films
1995 action drama films
1995 films
Films directed by Selva (director)
Films scored by Vidyasagar
Indian action drama films
Twins in Indian films